Croydon South could refer to

Croydon South, Victoria
Croydon South (UK Parliament constituency)
Croydon South (historic UK Parliament constituency)

See also
South Croydon